Fazenda da Bica is a region of Rio de Janeiro, but not officially recognized as a neighborhood.

References

Neighbourhoods in Rio de Janeiro (city)